Daniele Sepe (born 17 April 1960 in Naples) is an Italian musician, known internationally for interpreting protest songs from around the world.

His first instrument was the flute, which he played at the San Pietro a Majella conservatoire.  After graduating, he began performing with the Gruppo operaio 'E Zezi di Pomigliano d'Arco, playing at numerous festivals and recording a few albums.

Sepe soon, however, became more interested in jazz and learned to play the saxophone.  He continued recording and began performing with many prominent musicians, like Nino D'Angelo, Gino Paoli, Eduardo de Crescenzo, Mia Martini, Teresa de Sio, Roberto de Simone, Peppino Gagliardi, Nino Bonocore and Roberto Murolo.  His band, which played under several names, varied widely, from purely wind instruments to big bands.  He also composed music for the theatre, cinema and ballet.

In 1994, Sepe recorded Vite Perdite, which was much more successful than any of his previous niche recordings.  It was dubbed album of year by Rockerilla, one of the one hundred greatest albums of the 1990s by Rockstar, and received a rave review from Folk-Roots, an English magazine.

Discography

References

External links

 Official Site
 Official Weblog
 Official MySpace Site

Italian jazz saxophonists
Male saxophonists
Italian jazz flautists
1960 births
Living people
Musicians from Naples
21st-century saxophonists
21st-century Italian male musicians
Male jazz musicians
21st-century flautists